Hans Kleefeld (7 April 1929 – 10 March 2016) was a Canadian identity designer, known from his work for companies such as Bank of Montreal, Air Canada, Air Jamaica and Toronto-Dominion Bank. Hans was born in Berlin and moved to Toronto, Ontario, Canada in 1952. He taught at the Ontario College of Art and Design for many years and subsequently at Sheridan College, Ontario.

References

External links 
 Census design at The Canadian Design Resource
 Saldanha, Errol. Canadian Icons, Applied Arts Magazine, p. 48.

1929 births
2016 deaths
Canadian designers